Viboyo Oweyo, real name Nsubuga Moses, is a Ugandan musician and record producer. He is signed to Swangz Avenue. He's credited for his rap ups every year ( a compilation of events that happened throughout the year.)He has collaborated with music heavy weights like Radio and Weasel "Nyumbani", Cindy Sanyu, "nyumirwa", Irene Ntale, In "Banyilila", "St Nelly Sade in rap up 2018", And Gnl ZAMBA vocals appeared on his rap up 2019.

Music
Viboyo Oweyo was born in 1984 to Nsubuga Moses. He started his music career in 1997 with hip-hop. In 2002 he changed to Afro-beat and released songs like "Owino  Muwulire". He released his first album, Boyo's Dream, in 2005.

He put his music career on hold to promote and write songs for other musicians. He was an artist manager and producer. He returned to music in 2010 with songs like "Gyembadde", "Muzik"and "Nyumbani" ft. Radio and Weasel. His second album, Kiwundo Afilliationz (The Masterpiece) was released in 2014. His third album, Desire, is scheduled for release in 2015.

Viboyo Oweyo's music is distributed by CDrun International, an international company that distributes music through different channels. His music is also available on YouTube, SoundCloud, and iTunes.

Discography

Songs
 RapUp 2018
 RapUp 2017
 RapUp 2016
 Music Africa
 Ajooga
 Keep Striving
 Muwulire
 Love Me Love Me
 Desire
 Appetizer
 Mbikwata Mpola
 Amulimba
 Bisima
 Nyoso Na Motema
 Survival
 Sente
 Banyilila with Irene Ntale
 Gimme di Title
 Nyumbani with Goodlyfe Crew
 Zzina
 Mukka
 Pale Pote
 Tukola
 We Go
 Time
 Nyumirwa
 Kitoobero
 Parey
 Ndi Mu fix
 Sibawulila with Mun G
 The Beat

Albums
Kiwundo Afilliationz (The Masterpiece), 2014
Desire, 2015

Nominations and awards
Viboyo has been nominated various times for Ugandan music and entertainment awards. He won the following awards:
 HiPipo Music Awards, Best Afropop Song 2012
 Buzz Teenies, Best Collabo 2012
 HiPipo Music Awards, Best Afrobeat song 2013, "Love Me Love Me"

References

External links 
"Viboyo Releases RapUp 2018"
"Nyumbani By Viboyo, Radio & Weasel"
"All Viboyo Oweyo Music"
"Viboyo Music"

1984 births
21st-century Ugandan male singers
Living people
Kumusha